Arie Kaan (22 December 1901 – 8 October 1991) was a Dutch hurdler. He competed in the men's 110 metres hurdles at the 1928 Summer Olympics.

References

1901 births
1991 deaths
Athletes (track and field) at the 1928 Summer Olympics
Dutch male hurdlers
Olympic athletes of the Netherlands
Sportspeople from Haarlem